Alma is a civil parish on the Bay of Fundy in the southwestern corner of Albert County, New Brunswick, Canada. It comprises one village and one local service district (LSD), both of which are members of the Southeast Regional Service Commission. The most notable feature of the parish is Fundy National Park, which takes up a majority of the parish's area.

The census subdivision of the same name includes all of the parish except the village of Alma, which forms its own census subdivision. The population of the parish CSD is so small that census numbers are rounded to maintain privacy. Revised census figures based on the 2023 local governance reforms have not been released.

Origin of name
The parish was named for its resemblance to the heights above the Alma River, site of the Battle of Alma, a decisive British/French/Egyptian victory over Russia in 1854.

History
Cumberland County, Nova Scotia included the territory now known as Alma Parish until the division of Nova Scotia and New Brunswick.

Initially modern Alma parish was split three ways. Saint Martins Parish in Saint John County extended eastward to the boundary of Hopewell Parish, but ran only as far north as the extension of the northern line of Saint John County. The remainder of Alma was in Westmorland County, with Hopewell Parish extending north past Alma Parish's northern line, and the area north of Saint Martins Parish and west of Hopewell not assigned to any parish until Salisbury Parish was erected in 1787. This put the community of Alma in Saint Martins Parish, Hebron in Hopewell Parish, and Teahans Corner in Salisbury Parish.

The county line between Saint John County and Westmorland County shifted westward in 1837 and the orphaned part of Saint Martins Parish was added to Hopewell but not the area to its north. The next year the newly erected Harvey Parish included all of Alma.

Boundaries
Alma Parish is bounded:
on the north by a line beginning about 550 metres southeasterly of Wolfe Lake, then running north 72º east to the western line of Harvey Parish;
on the east beginning at a point about 3 kilometres northeasterly of the junction of Red School House Road and Collier Mountain Road, on the prolongation of the eastern line of a grant to William Hoar, then running southerly along the prolongation and the grant to strike the shore of Rocher Bay about 1.1 kilometres southwest of the mouth of Alcorn Brook;
on the south by Rocher Bay, Chignecto Bay, and the Bay of Fundy;
on the west by the Saint John and Kings County lines;

Municipality
The village of Alma contains all of the parish east of Fundy National Park and south of New Ireland Road.

Local service district
The local service district of the parish of Alma legally contains all of the parish not in the village of Alma; in practice the national park is separate from the LSD.

The LSD was established on 1 November 1973 to assess for fire protection after the village of Alma was reduced in size from including in the entire parish. Ambulance service was added on 21 January 1976.

Today the LSD assesses for community & recreation services in addition to the basic LSD services of fire protection, police services, land use planning, emergency measures, and dog control The taxing authority is 632.00 Alma.

National park
Fundy National Park is in the southwestern section of the parish, bounded on the north by Shepody Road and on east by Forty-Five Road, Lake Brook, and the Salmon River. It contains most of the parish and is under federal administration.

Communities
Communities at least partly within the parish; bold indicates a municipality
Alma
Hebron
Teahans Corner

Bodies of water
Bodies of water at least partly in the parish:

Broad River
Bay of Fundy
Chignecto Bay
Forty Five River
Point Wolfe River
Rocher Bay
Upper Salmon River
at least 13 named lakes

Other notable places
Parks, historic sites, and other noteworthy places in the parish.
 Upper Salmon River Protected Natural Area

Demographics

Population
Parish population total does not include the former incorporated village of Alma. Revised census figures based on the 2023 local governance reforms have not been released.

Access routes
Highways and numbered routes that run through the parish, including external routes that start or finish at the parish limits:

Highways

Principal Routes
None

Secondary Routes:

External Routes:
None

See also
List of parishes in New Brunswick

Notes

References

External links
 Village of Alma

Parishes of Albert County, New Brunswick
Local service districts of Albert County, New Brunswick